Born to Race is a 2011 direct-to-video action film directed by Alex Ranarivelo, and stars Joseph Cross and John Pyper-Ferguson.

Plot 

Born To Race is the story of Danny Krueger (Joseph Cross), a rebellious young street racer on a collision course with trouble. After an accident at an illegal street race, he is sent to a small town to live with his estranged father (John Pyper-Ferguson), a washed up NASCAR racer. Attending high school, Danny meets Jessica (Nicole Badaan). She invites him to a party. Attempting to integrate, Danny accepts the invitation. At the party Danny runs into the local hot shot Jake Kendall (Brando Eaton). The two characters clash. Jake rules the neighborhood fiercely, and Danny will have to live up to those standards in order to become accepted, which means that he shall have to race again.

Meanwhile the relationship between Danny and his father has its own ups and downs. Danny cannot get over the fact that his father left him and his mother when he was still a young child. In his struggle to find his ways in his new hometown, he cannot get around his father, and through dialogue the two slowly come to realize that they have more in common then they suspected. When Danny decides to enter the NHRA High School Drags, he is forced to seek his father's help in taking down his rival Jake Kendall. Danny and Jake both advance to the finals. In the finals, Danny narrowly wins the race after Jake is injured in a fiery crash.

Cast 
Joseph Cross as Danny Krueger
John Pyper-Ferguson as Frank Krueger 
Brando Eaton as Jake Kendall
Nicole Badaan as Jessica Dalton
Sherry Stringfield as Lisa Abrams
Spencer Breslin as Max
Christina Moore as Ms. Parker 
Erik King as Mr. Briggs 
Johanna Braddy as Rachel 
Matt McCoy as Joe 
Grant Show as Jimmy Kendall
Rehan Khan as Bona 
Chelsea Heath as Andrea Faust
Michael Esparza as Sanchez 
Ali Afshar as himself 
Whitmer Thomas as Harry
Badal Bhowmik as Racer

Sequel
A sequel Born to Race: Fast Track was released in 2014 with Brett Davern and Beau Mirchoff replacing both Cross and Eaton as Danny Krueger and Jake Kendall, Bill Sage replaces Ferguson as Frank Krueger, while Badaan reprise her role as Jessica. In the film, after winning a scholarship to the prestigious Fast Lane Racing Academy, Danny finds himself competing against some of the fiercest young drivers in the world. Tension soars on and off the track and a terrible incident leaves Danny without a racing partner. Facing dismissal from the academy, he is forced to team up with Jake Kendall. The pair must learn to set aside their differences as they vie for rookie spots on a professional racing team.

External links

References 

2011 films
2011 action films
American action films
American auto racing films
Drag racing
Films about families
2010s English-language films
2010s American films